The 2002 Idaho gubernatorial election was held on November 5, 2002 to select the governor of the state of Idaho. Dirk Kempthorne, the Republican incumbent, defeated Democratic nominee Jerry Brady to win a second term, but the win was not nearly as overwhelming as Kempthorne's 1998 victory. This was the first Idaho gubernatorial election since 1978 in which the winner was of the same party as the incumbent president.

Republican primary

Candidates
Walter L. Bayes
Milt Erhart, perennial candidate
Raynelle J. George
Dirk Kempthorne, incumbent Governor of Idaho

Results

Democratic primary

Candidates
Jerry Brady, newspaper publisher
Rue T. Stears

Results

Libertarian primary

Candidates
Daniel L. J. Adams, perennial candidate
Michael Monroe Gollaher (write-in)

Results

General election

Campaign
Although Brady performed considerably better than 1998 Democratic gubernatorial nominee Robert C. Huntley and won in Ada County, Kempthorne won reelection with a comfortable majority.

Predictions

Results

References

See also
Governor of Idaho
List of governors of Idaho
Idaho gubernatorial elections

2002 United States gubernatorial elections
2002
Gubernatorial